Nitocris possibly was the last pharaoh of ancient Egypt's Sixth Dynasty. Her name is found in Herodotus' Histories (430BC) and in writings by the 3rd-century BC Manetho, but her historicity has been questioned. If she was in fact a historical person, then she may have been an interregnum queen, the sister of Merenre Nemtyemsaf II and the daughter of Pepi II and Queen Neith. Alternatively, the Egyptologist Kim Ryholt has argued that Nitocris is legendary and derives from the historical male pharaoh Neitiqerty Siptah, who succeeded Merenre Nemtyemsaf II at the transition between the Old Kingdom and First Intermediate Period.

Greek tradition
According to Herodotus (Histories ii-100), she invited the murderers of her brother, the "king of Egypt", to a banquet, then killed them by flooding the sealed room with the Nile.
 ... [Nitocris] succeeded her brother. He had been the king of Egypt, and he had been put to death by his subjects, who then placed her upon the throne. Determined to avenge his death, she devised a cunning scheme by which she destroyed a vast number of Egyptians. She constructed a spacious underground chamber and, on pretense of inaugurating it, threw a banquet, inviting all those whom she knew to have been responsible for the murder of her brother. Suddenly as they were feasting, she let the river in upon them by means of a large, secret duct. (Herodotus)

Then, to avoid the other conspirators, she committed suicide (possibly by running into a burning room). Manetho claims she built the "third pyramid" at Giza, which is attributed by modern historians and archaeologists to pharaoh Menkaure of the Fourth dynasty.

Egyptian records
Nitocris is not mentioned, however, in any native Egyptian inscriptions and she possibly did not exist. It was long thought that Nitocris appears on a fragment of the Turin King List, dated to the Nineteenth Dynasty, under the Egyptian name of Nitiqreti (nt-ỉqrtỉ). The fragment where this name appears was thought to belong to the Sixth Dynasty portion of the king list, thus appearing to confirm both Herodotus and Manetho. However, microscopic analysis of the Turin King List suggests the fragment was misplaced in reassembling the fragmentary text, and that the name Nitiqreti is in fact a faulty transcription of the prenomen of a male king Netjerkare Siptah I, who is named on the Abydos King List as the successor of the Sixth Dynasty king Nemtyemsaf II. On the Abydos King List, Netjerkare Siptah is placed in the equivalent spot that Neitiqerty Siptah holds on the Turin King List.

In fiction
Two letters in the name are transposed in Bolesław Prus' 1895 historical novel Pharaoh, where "Nikotris" appears as the mother of the protagonist, Pharaoh "Ramses XIII" (there were only eleven pharaohs of that name).
The Queen's Enemies, a play by Lord Dunsany, is based upon Herodotus' account of Nitocris' murderous activities.
Nitocris is mentioned in two stories by H. P. Lovecraft, "The Outsider" and "Imprisoned with the Pharaohs". She is mentioned only in passing and portrayed as an evil queen reigning over ghouls and other horrors. 
Tennessee Williams' first published work is the 1928 short story "The Vengeance of Nitocris", detailing the queen's careful plan for revenge. She makes the people who slew her brother die in a fitting way.
Le Basalte Bleu, a book by John Knittel, has a sort of time-travel plot in which the main character falls in love with the ancient queen. Knittel speculates that the origin of the Cinderella fairy tale lies in the marriage of Nitocris, who lost her golden sandal only to have it later found by the pharaoh.
Nitocris La Dame de Memphis is a book by Pierre Montlaur.
"The Mirror of Nitocris", a short story by Brian Lumley, features a mirror that once belonged to Nitocris which unleashes evil forces upon its owners.
Nitocris is Queen to Merenra II in the novel Rhodopis of Nubia by Nobel laureate Naguib Mahfouz, which tells the fateful love story of Pharaoh Merenra II (successor to Pepi II Six Dynasty) and the courtesan Rhodopis.
Karl Sanders has a song called "Slavery Unto Nitokris" on his second solo album, Saurian Exorcisms.
"By Scarab and Scorpion", a short story featuring the Green Hornet by Mark Ellis, features a plot involving an Egyptian museum exhibition featuring Queen Nitocris.
The title song from Celtic Frost's 1985 album "Morbid Tales" is based on the legend of Nitocris.
Nitocris appears in The Mummy and Miss Nitocris by George Griffith, where she is the namesake of an Egyptologist's daughter in whose person she is reincarnated.
Nitocris appears in Fate/Grand Order as a Caster-class, an Assassin-class and later an Avenger-class Servant with ties to Horus, Medjed and Anubis. As Servants are influenced by fictional interpretations of their legends, Nitocris' powers are mostly based on Lovecraft and Lumley's stories about her, and she wields the titular mirror from the latter as her weapon.
 A character named Nitocris appears in the Assassin's Creed Origins tie in novel, Desert Oath.  She is the God's Wife of Amun in Karnak temple and mother of Isidora. Her death between the novel and the events of the Curse of the Pharaohs DLC give Isidora motivation to use an Apple of Eden to bring about the wrath of the undead on Thebes.

Further reading
Newberry, Percy Edward. 1943. "Queen Nitocris of the Sixth Dynasty". Journal of Egyptian Archæology 29:51–54.
Zivie-Coche, Christiane M. 1972. "Nitocris, Rhodopis et la troisième pyramide de Giza". Bulletin de l’Institut français d’archéologie orientale 72:115–138. PDF

References

External links
"Herodotus on Nitocris"

22nd-century BC Pharaohs
22nd-century BC women rulers
Female pharaohs
Fictional pharaohs
Kings of Egypt in Herodotus
People whose existence is disputed
Pharaohs of the Sixth Dynasty of Egypt